The Brown's Island Dam Walk, also known as the VEPCO Levee Dam is a structure across the James River in Richmond, Virginia that connects Brown's Island to the James River Parks System on the Manchester side of the river. It was originally constructed as a dam in 1901 by the Virginia Electric and Power Company (VEPCO) (now known as Dominion Power). The bridge has been renamed the T. Tyler Potterfield Memorial bridge after a senior planner in the Richmond Department of Planning and Development Review who was the project manager for the bridge's redevelopment into a pedestrian bridge.

History of dam redevelopment 
There have been advocates for the creation of a dam walkway since before 2008, when city officials began to promote development initiatives along the river as part of their master planning process. In 2008, Richmond Planning Commission released a Downtown plan discussing development initiatives along the river. Ralph White, Richmond's naturalist (widely credited with the success of the James River Park system)  was quoted as saying  and said "The highest single priority is the completion of the VEPCO levee," 

By 2011, other public advocates were meeting with City of Richmond Department of Planning and Development and the consultant team from the architecture firm Hargreaves Associates (the firm hired to execute downtown plans) to make the pedestrian walkway a reality.

In November 2012, The City adopted the final version of the Richmond Riverfront Plan  that showed several renderings and maps of a redeveloped Dam Walk using a pedestrian bridge feature.

In January 2014, the city released additional detailed plans for the walk, which includes the fact that it will be 10 feet wide and have at least four overlooks. Additional plans released in June 2014 were described by the Richmond Times Dispatch as: "The guardrails are expected to be 48 inches high -- six more than required to accommodate the expected bicycle traffic on the bridge. The deck would be placed over the existing piers and structures, but would require new augmented metal framework. The walkway would have lower, dim lights so as to not overpower the view of the river. Plans are underway for unified wayfinding markers and interpretive signage."

In June 2014, the Virginia Commonwealth Transportation Board allocated $2.5 million to the Dam project, supplementing the $9 million the city has dedicated, to ensure the Dam Walk is fully funded.  The Richmond times Dispatch quoted city Planning Director Mark Olinger as saying “This money gives us clear sailing on getting all the Brown’s Island [dam walk] stuff done, which we think will be an outstanding addition to the city.” In May 2014, the Richmond Planning Commission requested that the bridge be named in honor of the late T. Tyler Potterfield, a senior planner with the city who was leading the dam walk project before his sudden death in late April. A resolution passed by the Planning Commission called the project one of the crowning achievements of Potterfield’s career.

The bridge was reopened on December 2, 2016 after a $11.3 million renovation that began in October 2015. The wheelchair accessible bridge is open to pedestrians and cyclists 24 hours a day.

References

Geography of Richmond, Virginia
Dams completed in 1901
Dams on the James River